Dizgah (also Romanized as Dīzgāh; also known as Deyrgāh) is a village in Kuhestani-ye Talesh Rural District, in the Central District of Talesh County, Gilan Province, Iran. At the 2006 census, its population was 173, in 49 families.

References 

Tageo

Populated places in Talesh County